Leo Wiener (1862–1939) was an American historian, linguist, author and translator.

Biography
Wiener was born in Białystok (then in the Russian Empire), of Lithuanian Jewish origin. His father was Zalmen (Solomon) Wiener, and his mother was Frejda Rabinowicz. He studied at the University of Warsaw in 1880, and then at the Friedrich Wilhelm University in Berlin.  Wiener later declared, "Having 'for many years been a member of the Unitarian Church,' and having 'preached absolute amalgamation with the Gentile surroundings', [I] 'never allied with the Jewish Church or with Jews as such."

Wiener left Europe with the plan of founding a vegetarian commune in British Honduras (now Belize). He sailed steerage to New Orleans. On his arrival, in 1880, he had no money. After travel and work around the US, he went to Kansas City, Missouri, and became a lecturer in the department of Germanic and Romance languages at the University of Kansas. He was a polyglot, and was reputed to speak thirty languages well.

Wiener published articles on Yiddish linguistic elements in Polish, German, Ukrainian, and Belarusian. In 1898, Wiener traveled to Europe to collect material for his book The History of Yiddish Literature in the Nineteenth Century (1899). Isaac Peretz encouraged him and Abraham Harkavy, librarian at the Asiatic Museum of St. Petersburg, presented him with a thousand Yiddish books, which formed the basis of the Yiddish collection of the Harvard University library. After this project Wiener's interest in Yiddish declined.

Beginning in 1896, Wiener lectured on Slavic cultures at Harvard University and became the first American professor of Slavic literature. He compiled a valuable anthology of Russian literature and translated 24 volumes of Lev Tolstoy's works into English, a task which he completed in 24 months. He taught George Rapall Noyes.

Major works

Family
In 1893 Wiener married Bertha Kahn. The mathematician Norbert Wiener was their son. Though he himself was a prodigy, he believed in nurture and became dedicated to turn his son into a genius. Norbert Wiener graduated from Ayer High School in 1906 at 11 years of age, and then entered Tufts College. He was awarded a BA in mathematics in 1909 at the age of 14, whereupon he began graduate studies of zoology at Harvard. In 1910 he transferred to Cornell to study philosophy. He graduated in 1911 at the age of 17.

References

External links 

 
 
 
 Works by Leo Wiener at The Online Books Page

1862 births
American people of Polish-Jewish descent
Harvard University faculty
1939 deaths
American historians
Linguists from the United States
Translators of Leo Tolstoy
Emigrants from the Russian Empire to the United States